United Nations Security Council resolution 704, adopted without a vote on 9 August 1991, after examining the application of the Marshall Islands for membership in the United Nations, the Council recommended to the General Assembly that the Marshall Islands be admitted.

On 17 September 1991, the General Assembly admitted the Republic of the Marshall Islands under Resolution 46/3.

See also
 List of United Nations member states
 List of United Nations Security Council Resolutions 701 to 800 (1991–1993)

References

External links
 
Text of the Resolution at undocs.org

 0704
 0704
 0704
August 1991 events
1991 in the Marshall Islands